Eric Topole Perez (also known as Tanner) is an American model and former simply actor born on December 6, 1992, in Miami, Florida. He is known for working in pornography films created by the studio Sean Cody under the alias of Tanner.

Biography 
Perez was born on December 6, 1992, in Miami, Florida. In 2011 he began his career as a model for the models academy & agency Bello Mag in the summer's session of 2011, and in 2012 he began working as an erotic fighter for Thunders Arena Wrestling videos under the name of Mogly. In 2013 he began his career as a simply actor in the studio Sean Cody where he obtained fame and recognition; he finished his career in 2016. In 2018 he created his YouTube channel and currently works as a pilot. In 2019 the actor Daniel Newman uploaded a post to his Instagram account where he appears with Perez and rumors about an alleged relationship emerged online.

In 2012 Perez was arrested for clogging a fire extinguisher.

References 



Male pornographic film actors
Gay pornographic film actors
Male models from Florida
People from Miami
1992 births
Living people